Calvay, is a currently uninhabited island situated in the Sound of Eriskay in the Outer Hebrides, at . It is one of ten islands in the Sound of Barra, a Site of Community Importance for conservation.

It was here that the ship SS Politician ran aground with a cargo of whisky in 1941 and inadvertently provided the inspiration for Compton MacKenzie's 1947 novel Whisky Galore.

Islands of the Sound of Barra
Uninhabited islands of the Outer Hebrides